IndieWeb is a community of people building software to enable
personal, independently hosted websites to independently maintain
their social data on their own web domains rather than on large,
centralized social networking services. First developed at a
series of conferences known as IndieWebCamp by Tantek Çelik,
Amber Case, Aaron Parecki, Crystal Beasley<ref
name="website"/> and Kevin Marks,<ref
name="finley"/> it uses a suite of tools
including Webmention and microformats in order to decentralize
social communication and distribution of content.

The IndieWeb is based on 10 core principles:

 Own your data.
 Use & publish visible data for humans first, machines second.
 Make what you need.
 Use what you make.
 Document your stuff.
 Open source your stuff.
 UX and design is more important than protocols, formats, data models, schema etc.
 Modularity.
 Longevity.
 Plurality.

and an informal eleventh: "Above all, Have fun."

See also
 Solid (web decentralization project)
 Distributed social network
 Comparison of software and protocols for distributed social networking

References

External links

 Official website

Blog software
Communications protocols